Gerold Pawirodikromo (born 20 January 1958) is a Surinamese former middle distance runner. He is best known for winning a silver medal in the 800 metres at the 1978 Central American and Caribbean Games in Medellín, Colombia behind only Alberto Juantorena with a time of 1:47.46. He also competed at the 1979 Pan American Games in San Juan, Puerto Rico. 

He began training as a 12-year old in 1970. He went to the Andre Kamperveen Stadium for track cycling with his brother, but track and field trainer Vincent Burgos convinced him to try out athletics at the same venue. He became a member of track & field athletics club Olympia in Paramaribo and had many local victories, first at the 100 and 200 meter events. His second coach-trainer John Lieveld turned him into a 400 meters runner. In 1977, he went to Washington State University to study and compete. In the USA his American coach let him specialize on the 800 meters event. Pawirodikromo was an NCAA indoor all-American in the mile relay in 1980.

References

Living people
1950s births
Surinamese male middle-distance runners
Competitors at the 1978 Central American and Caribbean Games
Central American and Caribbean Games silver medalists for Suriname
Athletes (track and field) at the 1979 Pan American Games
Pan American Games competitors for Suriname
Washington State Cougars men's track and field athletes
Surinamese people of Indonesian descent
Place of birth missing (living people)
Central American and Caribbean Games medalists in athletics